Mudvayne is the fifth studio album by American heavy metal band Mudvayne, released on December 21, 2009, it was the band's final album before entering an eleven-year hiatus in 2010. The material from the album was recorded simultaneously with the material that appeared on  The New Game. "Beautiful and Strange", a single from the band, was made available for streaming on the band's website and MySpace page on October 7, 2009. There was no tour to support the album, which had little promotion; sales were also weak.

Production
Following the release of Lost and Found in 2005, Chad Gray and Greg Tribbett formed the heavy metal supergroup Hellyeah. They released their self-titled album in 2007. The following year Mudvayne released their fourth album The New Game to lukewarm reviews. Chad Gray has said "I love being in two bands. I really do. You get to explore both sides of yourself. I think everybody has this severed half. The kind [that] co-exists outside of your work. I was able to kind of climb into that skin."

The album was produced by Jeremy Parker and David Fortman.

Musical style
The album's style has mainly been described by critics as nu metal. Phil Freeman of AllMusic believes that the album is heavier than the band's previous album, The New Game, and has compared its sound to Tool and Linkin Park.

Release
On October 7, Mudvayne revealed a new song, "Beautiful and Strange". The song creates a mix of styles used in The New Game and older albums as well. It was also revealed that the first single from the album, "Scream with Me", will begin receiving airplay on November 17, 2009. However, a week before, it premiered on Noisecreep at 12:01 AM. Another song, "Heard It All Before" was made available for streaming. On November 10, iTunes released a three-song set from the new album, titled Mudvayne - EP, with the songs "Beautiful and Strange", "Scream with Me", and "Heard It All Before". A digital download of the full album was released on December 7, 2009 to those who pre-ordered the album.

The album was released through Epic Records on December 18, 2009 in Germany and three days later in North America. The album art was printed entirely in blacklight-reactive ink, including the cover and liner notes, that can only be seen when under a blacklight. The cover art design was created by tattoo artist Paul Booth. Booth commented on the art: "This project has been absolutely killer to work on! The whole black light concept was totally experimental and quite the challenge, so of course, as an artist, I was drawn to it like a moth to a bugzapper. I am happy to see bands focusing more energy on their album art... something I thought the Internet had killed.

Mudvayne considers their second studio album, The End of All Things to Come, to be the band's "black album". For the release of their self-titled album, the band hoped to create their "white album", which would be reflected through the cover art. Without a blacklight present, the entire album packaging appears to be blank white paper.

There are different release editions of Mudvayne available; a standard edition, vinyl edition, deluxe and super deluxe edition. All release editions feature blacklight-reactive ink, and the super deluxe edition is only available through Mudvayne's online store.

Reception

The album received mixed to positive reviews from critics, with Metacritic giving the album a score of 53 out of 100.

The Boston Globe gave the album a mixed review, writing "Mudvayne's fifth studio album at times sound[s] clumsy." Another mixed review appeared in the Los Angeles Times, stating "Mudvayne has by and large returned to what it does best (or at least do frequently) on its new self-titled album."

Phil Freeman of AllMusic gave the album a two-and-a-half star rating and wrote in his review "There are some surprises on Mudvayne, like a surprisingly Slash-like guitar solo on 'Closer' and the death metal intro to the Slipknot-esque 'I Can't Wait,' but too much of it is more of the same from the band."

Spin gave the album a mixed review, writing "These guys once flailed like a future-prog version of Slipknot (whose Shawn Crahan served as executive producer on L.D. 50), but now their doomy riff-o-rama comes equipped with mellow-bellow butt-rock choruses."

The album debuted at No. 54 on the Billboard 200, selling around 34,000 copies. However, the next week it peaked at No. 53 but the sales dropped 59% and only 14,000 copies were sold.

Track listing

Personnel
Mudvayne
 Chad Gray − vocals
 Greg Tribbett − guitars
 Ryan Martinie − bass
 Matthew McDonough − drums

Production and design
 Jeremy Parker − production
 Paul Booth − art direction and design

Charts

References

2009 albums
Albums produced by Dave Fortman
Epic Records albums
Mudvayne albums